A bCODE is an identifier that can be sent to a mobile phone/device and used as a ticket/voucher/identification or other type of token. The bCODE is an SMS message that can be read electronically from the screen of a mobile device.  Bcodes can be sent by text message, and as they are just a standard SMS they can be received on over 99% of all devices.

Bcodes have many uses such as advertising, loyalty programs, promotions, ticketing and more.

History 
bCODE was developed by an Australian company from 2003 to 2005.

bCODE Technology 
A bCODE is a simple SMS text message that looks something like this:

This text message is read from the screen of a mobile phone/device and decoded into a unique token ID.  This ID can then be used to supply the consumer with their own unique experience.

References

External links
 bCODE

Barcodes
Encodings
Automatic identification and data capture
Access control